"Hand of the Dead Body" is the second single from Scarface's third album, The Diary. It featured a verse from Ice Cube and a chorus from Devin the Dude and was produced by N.O. Joe Scarface and Co. Producer Mike Dean. "Hand of the Dead Body" found some success, making it to three Billboard charts, finding the most success on the rap charts where it peaked at 9. The song's lyrics is centered on the government, the media and music critics who are quick to attack gangsta rap for violence on the streets. A music video featuring Scarface and Ice Cube rapping in a conference was also released.

Single track listing

A-Side
 "Hand of the Dead Body" (Radio Mix)- 4:47
 "Hand of the Dead Body" (Instrumental)- 4:47
 "Hand of the Dead Body" (N.O. Radio Remix)- 4:53
 "Hand of the Dead Body" (N.O. Remix Instrumental)- 4:51

B-Side
 "Hand of the Dead Body" (Mike Dean Radio Remix)- 5:16
 "Hand of the Dead Body" (M. Dean Remix Instrumental)- 5:08
 "Mind Playin' Tricks 94"- 3:40

Charts

1994 singles
Scarface (rapper) songs
Ice Cube songs
Songs written by Ice Cube
Gangsta rap songs
Political rap songs
1994 songs